Hisahito is a masculine Japanese given name. People named Hisahito include the following:

, the later Emperor Go-Fukakusa
 (born 2006), grandson of Emperor Akihito
, J. League Division 1 football player

Japanese masculine given names